Tara Air Flight 193 was a scheduled domestic passenger flight from Pokhara to Jomsom, Nepal. On 24 February 2016, eight  minutes after take-off, the aircraft serving the flight, a Viking Air DHC-6-400 Twin Otter went missing with 23 people on board.
Hours later, the wreckage was found near the village of Dana, Myagdi District. There were no survivors. It was Tara Air's deadliest accident.

Aircraft
The DHC-6 Twin Otter was a Series 400 version built in 2012 by Viking Air with manufacturer's serial number 926. In September 2015, it was delivered to Tara Air and registered 9N-AHH.

Passengers
Of the 20 passengers on board, 18including 2 children were from Nepal, one was from Hong Kong, and another was from Kuwait.

Flight

The aircraft took off from Pokhara at 7:50am local time. The normal flight duration on the route is 18minutes. The control tower officers at Pokhara lost contact with the aircraft 10minutes after takeoff; the wreckage was found at Tirkhe Dhunga, Dana VDC of Myagdi district at 1:25pm by a police team deployed from Dana Police Post. Tara Air reported that the weather at both origin and destination airports was favourable.

During the flight, the co-pilot acted as the Pilot Flying and the captain as Pilot Monitoring. Over the Ghorepani area, the Ground Proximity Warning System (GPWS) began to sound. The aircraft was flying through clouds with a little visibility between clouds. The captain was accustomed to hearing GPWS warnings in normal flight, so it became a habit to disregard the warnings. About one minute before the accident the captain took over control and initiated a climb. Aviation Safety Network gives the probable cause as a loss of situational awareness when entering clouds while flying under Visual Flight Rules (VFR).

Recovery
Helicopters were used to search the route for hours, but rescue efforts were slowed down by poor weather conditions, including dense fog and heavy rain. The wreckage was found burning after impacting a mountainside, with charred bodies visible inside. Bishwa Raj Khadka, the district Chief of Police, stated that personnel involved in the rescue operations had recovered 17 bodies from the crash site.

Investigation
A commission was formed to investigate the crash. The wreckage was found spread about 200 meters in Solighopte, Myagdi District, Dhaulagiri Zone.

The final accident report, 17 months later, read: "The Commission concludes that the probable cause of this accident was the fact that despite of unfavourable weather conditions, the crew's repeated decision to enter into cloud during VFR flight and their deviation from the normal track due to loss of situational awareness aggravated by spatial disorientation leading to CFIT accident."

See also
Prinair Flight 277
Tara Air Flight 197

References

2016 in Nepal
Accidents and incidents involving the de Havilland Canada DHC-6 Twin Otter
Aviation accidents and incidents in 2016
Aviation accidents and incidents in Nepal
February 2016 events in Asia
2016 disasters in Nepal
Tara Air accidents and incidents